Helgoland is a book by Italian physicist Carlo Rovelli about quantum mechanics and the relational interpretation of it that Rovelli developed. The title refers to Heligoland, an island in the North Sea where Werner Heisenberg secluded himself while developing the basic ideas of quantum mechanics in 1925.

The book was first published in Italian in 2020, and an English translation by Erica Segre and Simon Carnell was published the following year. The Persian translation, translated by Samane Noroozi (Chatrang Publisher), was published the following year in Iran.

References

2020 non-fiction books
Penguin Books books
Italian non-fiction books
Physics books